Pyriatyn National Nature Park is a national park of Ukraine that covers a portion of the Uday River valley in the north central part of the country.  It provides nature conservation and recreation on the terraces and floodplains of the river.  The park is about 130 km east of Kyiv, and is in the administrative district of Pyriatyn in Poltava Oblast.

Topography
The park's borders form in clusters of territory strung along the Uday River, a tributary of the Dnieper River.  The sectors are sometimes separated by up to 1 km, and the river runs from northwest to southeast in this area.  The terrain is typical of river valleys in the East European Plain, with forest-steppe character on the slopes and wetlands on the floodplains and terraces.

Climate and ecoregion
The climate of Pyriatyn is Humid continental climate, warm summer (Köppen climate classification (Dfb)).

The park is located in the East European forest steppe ecoregion, a transition zone between the broadleaf forests of the north and the grasslands to the south.. This ecoregion is characterized by a mosaic of forests, steppe, and riverine wetlands.

Flora and fauna
Being centered along a river valley, the park displayed a variety of wetlands, with river and riverbank habitat at the lowest levels, reed beds on the floodplains, mesotrophic laves and streams on the terraces, and forest-steppe where drainage permits.

Public use

The park is relatively new (founded in 2009), and basic tourist infrastructure has been put in place.  Preliminary scientific inventories of plants and animals are underway, and the park sponsors educational programs for local schools.  A number of ecological hiking trails have been developed for visitors.

See also
 National Parks of Ukraine

References

External links